Airbus NSR ("New Short Range") was discussed as a replacement by Airbus for the A320. Initially it was rumoured to start design in 2014 and enter service around 2018. Available information was very scarce and relates mostly to rumours of "industry insiders" and efforts by Airbus seemed low.

The follow-on aircraft to replace the A320 was rumored to be named A30X.  Airbus North America President Barry Eccleston stated that the earliest a replacement aircraft could be available is 2017. In January 2010, John Leahy, Airbus's Chief Operating Officer Customers, stated that any all-new single aisle craft is unlikely to be constructed before 2024/2025.

The current A320 Enhanced includes a series of improvements of the A320 series which extend the lifetime. The A320neo also makes the development of a new aircraft unlikely.

See also

 Embraer E-Jet family
 Bombardier CSeries

References

NSR